Habronattus cognatus is a species of spider in the family Salticidae. It is found in North America.

References

Further reading

 
 
 
 
 
 

Salticidae
Spiders described in 1901